Piersons Lake is a lake in Carver County, Minnesota, in the United States.

Piersons Lake was named for John Pierson, a pioneer who settled there.

References

Lakes of Minnesota
Lakes of Carver County, Minnesota